Pictou Island is a Canadian island located in the Northumberland Strait approximately  north of Nova Scotia and  south of Prince Edward Island. The island has a length of 9.5 km, a width of 2.5 km and a total area of approximately 12.8 km2. The island is administratively part of Pictou County.

The island is heavily wooded, with several clearings on the more sheltered south side. There is a small year-round population spread throughout the island, of which the majority make their living by fishing. The island has a public wharf located at the west end and a breakwater for mooring at the east end. There is also a community centre, church, a Pioneer Cemetery, fire department and several lighthouses located on the island.

Pictou Island receives no electrical power from the mainland. The residents supply their own energy with solar power, windmills and generators.  There are no stores of any kind on the island, but residents can email or phone a grocery order into Sobeys (a national grocery chain), and the order will arrive by ferry or plane depending on the time of year.

A one-room public school operates at the Pictou Island Community Centre, with a single part-time teacher for students up to grade 6, after which students begin correspondence studies. Generally, island students enroll in schools on the mainland of Nova Scotia once they begin grade 11, as many post-secondary programs do not accept a correspondence studies diploma.

The Community Centre is also home to a provincially sponsored CAP Site (see http://cap.ic.gc.ca/index.htm ), which provides internet access to the public. Most island residents have access in their homes, through dial-up, and some are hoping for 'high-speed' soon.

A seasonal passenger-only ferry service begins operation in May and stops in November; Cessna airplanes operating out of an airport at nearby  Trenton serve the island in the winter with mail and supplies.  There is one main dirt road on the island that runs from one end of the island to the other that is maintained by the Nova Scotia Department of Transportation and also serves as a landing strip for the airplanes.

History
Pictou Island was claimed on October 17, 1809, by Charles Morris.  That same year it was granted by the Crown to Admiral Sir Alexander Forrester Inglis Cochrane, likely as a reward for Royal Navy victories secured under his command in the Napoleonic Wars.  Permanent European settlement of the island began in the 1810s.

External links 
 Topographical info
 Pictou Island Website
 Aerial Photos of Pictou Island, Pictou, Caribou and surrounding area. (www.avinova.ca)
 Featured in The Guardian

Islands of Nova Scotia
Communities in Pictou County
Landforms of Pictou County